David W. Piston is an American physicist. He is the Edward Mallinckrodt, Jr. Professor and Head of Cell Biology and Physiology at Washington University School of Medicine.

Education 
Piston completed a bachelor of arts in physics at Grinnell College in 1984. In 1986, he completed a master of science in physics at University of Illinois at Urbana–Champaign. He earned his doctor of philosophy in physics from the same institution in 1989. He was a postdoctoral researcher in the lab of Watt W. Webb at Cornell University from 1989 to 1992.

Career
In 1992, Piston joined the faculty of Vanderbilt University where his laboratory worked on pancreatic beta cells and then later alpha cells. In 2015, he was recruited to Washington University School of Medicine to serve as Head of the Department of Cell Biology and Physiology.

References

External links 
Official website

Living people
Year of birth missing (living people)
20th-century American physicists
21st-century American physicists
Grinnell College alumni
University of Illinois Urbana-Champaign alumni
Washington University School of Medicine faculty
Washington University physicists
Presidents of the Biophysical Society